Connecticut's 4th congressional district is a congressional district in the U.S. state of Connecticut. Located in the southwestern part of the state, the district is largely suburban and extends from Bridgeport, the largest city in the state, to Greenwich – an area largely coextensive with the Connecticut side of the New York metropolitan area. The district also extends inland, toward Danbury and toward the Lower Naugatuck Valley.

The district is currently represented by Democrat Jim Himes. With a Cook Partisan Voting Index rating of D+13, it is the most Democratic district in Connecticut, a state with an all-Democratic congressional delegation.

Towns in the district
The district includes the following towns:

Fairfield County – Bridgeport, Darien, Easton, Fairfield, Greenwich, Monroe, New Canaan, Norwalk, Redding, Ridgefield, Shelton (part), Stamford, Trumbull, Weston, Westport, and Wilton.

New Haven County – Oxford.

Voter registration

Recent presidential elections 
Historically, the 4th was a classic "Yankee Republican" district. However, it has not supported a Republican for president since 1988, and has swung increasingly Democratic at the national level since the 1990s. This culminated in 2020, when Joe Biden won it with 64 percent of the vote, his best showing in the state.

Recent elections
Even as the district swung increasingly Democratic at the national level, Republicans usually held this district without serious difficulty until the turn of the millennium. In 2004, however, Democrat Diane Farrell held longtime incumbent Chris Shays to only 52 percent of the vote, the closest race in the district in 30 years. Shays fended off an equally spirited challenge from Farrell in 2006 before losing to Himes in 2008. Himes has held the seat ever since.

1987 (special)

1988

1990

1992

1994

1996

1998

2000

2002

2004

2006

2008

2010

2012

2014

2016

2018

2020

List of members representing the district

Historical district boundaries

See also

Connecticut's congressional districts
List of United States congressional districts

References
Notes

Bibliography

 Congressional Biographical Directory of the United States 1774–present

4
History of Fairfield County, Connecticut
New Haven County, Connecticut
Political history of Connecticut
Constituencies established in 1837
1837 establishments in Connecticut